Wiston is a small village in South Lanarkshire, Scotland.

Located in the Southern Uplands it is immediately to the south of Tinto, one of the highest points in the locality. The Garf Water, a tributary of the River Clyde, runs through the village.

The village has hosted the Tinto Folk Music Festival. Wiston Lodge is a former Victorian hunting lodge built in the 1850s set in a  estate. It is now a venue for team-building activities including programmes leading to John Muir Awards.

References

External links
 Wiston Lodge

Villages in South Lanarkshire